Winnifrith is a surname. Notable people with the surname include:

 John Winnifrith (1908–1994), British civil servant at the Ministry of Agriculture
 Tom Winnifrith (born 1968), British journalist, share tipster, and fund manager